Tulane–Lakeside Hospital is a hospital in Metairie, Louisiana that specializes in woman's health services.  Since its opening in 1964, the hospital has delivered over 1,000,000 babies and treated over 300,000 patients.  It is a part of Tulane Medical Center. Tulane University and LCMC announced on October 10, 2022 that LCMC would purchase Tulane Medical Center (along with Lakeview Regional Medical Center, and Tulane Lakeside Hospital) from HCA for $150 Million.

References

 https://tulanelakeside.com/about/index.dot

External links
Tulane-Lakeside Hospital website

Hospital buildings completed in 1964
Hospitals in Louisiana
Buildings and structures in Jefferson Parish, Louisiana
1964 establishments in Louisiana